Elizabeth Steel ( – 1795), also known as Betty Steel,  was an English convict sent to Australia aboard a ship of the Second Fleet. Convicted in 1787 for the theft of a silver watch worth thirty shillings, she was sentenced to seven years penal transportation which she served at the settlements of Port Jackson and Norfolk Island. She was freed in 1794 but died ten months later.

Steel arrived in Sydney Cove as a convict on board Lady Juliana on 3 June 1790, as part of the Second Fleet, aged 23 or 24. At the time of her sentencing authorities described her as being 'mute by visitation of God', which is the earliest record of a deaf Australian, but there is no historical evidence yet that she used a sign language. Her charge at the Old Bailey was for stealing a silver watch from George Childs, who was a customer at the public house she worked at as a prostitute. After two months in Sydney, Elizabeth Steel was transferred to Norfolk Island. In November 1791, Steel married a fellow convict, Irish born James Mackey. Together they successfully farmed a  leasehold until the expiry of their sentences. Elizabeth returned to Sydney in 1794, but died the following year aged 29. Her burial at the Old Sydney Burial Ground was recorded on 8 June 1795.

Headstone found
In 1991, Sydney Town Hall underwent major restoration works, during which excavations to lay new stormwater pipes under the Lower Town Hall, workmen discovered evidence of burials. Archaeologists were then employed to excavate the site and record their findings. Overlying the lid of one of the graves discovered in 1991 was the upper portion of a Georgian headstone, made of Sydney sandstone. Remnants of an inscription were visible:

In Memory of

Eliz Steel died

1795 Aged …

Although this headstone was found above the remains of the vault containing the skeletal remains of a female, forensic tests confirmed that there was no relationship between them. It is thought that the headstone may have fallen from another grave, possibly during the construction of the Town Hall in the late 1860s.

See also
List of convicts transported to Australia

References

Further reading
The story of Betty Steel : deaf convict and pioneer by Jan Branson and Don Miller
Jackson, P.W. & Lee, R.* (Eds.).(2001). Deaf lives: Deaf people in history. Middlesex, ENG: British Deaf History Society

External links
23 May, 1787. Old Bailey
24 October, 1787. Old Bailey
Collage - Works on International Deaf History
Deaf Crime Casebook by Peter Jackson

Convicts transported to Australia on the Second Fleet
Australian deaf people
1760s births
1795 deaths
People from Sydney
Place of birth unknown
Australian convict women
British female criminals